Amber Littlejohn (born July 6, 1975) is an American bodybuilder. She was an IFBB professional figure competitor from the United States. Littlejohn placed in the top-five in almost every show after turning pro with an overall win at the 2003 NPC Figure Nationals.

Early life
Littlejohn was born in Monterey, California to an African American and Native American (Cherokee) father and an Irish mother. She was raised by hippy parents who were passionate about education. Littlejohn grew up in a family of six children and was the second youngest and the only female of the group. Growing up in a rural cabin with few amenities, Littlejohn did not watch television until the age nine.  She developed a deep interested in literature at a young age, becoming fond of authors such as Toni Morrison, Isabel Allende, Gabriel Garcia Marquez, and Ernest Hemingway.

Early career
In high school, Littlejohn participated in sports including track, martial arts and basketball. At the age of 23, she began weight training seriously to mend a broken heart and ended up falling in love with fitness.  After training for several years and learning gymnastics at age 25, Littlejohn entered her first fitness competition, the NPC San Jose Fitness and Figure Championships in 2001, where she took first place in fitness and figure. Following her first victory, Littlejohn decided to compete solely in figure competitions.

Competitive career
Littlejohn's highest professional competitive achievements were runner-up at the 2006 Ms. Figure Olympia and winning the 2006 inaugural IFBB Palm Beach Pro Figure Championships. After the 2006 Olympia, Littlejohn planned to retire from competing in figure to begin raising a family, but decided to compete at Figure Olympia in 2007 where she placed in sixth place.

Contest History
2001 NPC San Jose Fitness and Figure Championships, 1st
2001 NPC San Francisco Fitness and Figure Championships, 1st
2002 NPC Emerald Cup, 1st (Tall)
2002 NPC Ironmaiden, 3rd (Tall)
2003 NPC Nationals, 1st (Tall) and Overall Winner
2004 IFBB California Pro Figure, 3rd
2004 IFBB Ms. International, 10th
2004 IFBB MS. Olympia, 5th
2004 IFBB Pittsburgh Pro Figure, 7th
2004 IFBB Show of Strength Pro Championship, 3rd
2005 IFBB California Pro Figure, 2nd
2005 IFBB Charlotte Pro Championships, 2nd
2005 IFBB Ms International, 6th
2005 IFBB Ms. Olympia, 4th
2006 IFBB Ms. Olympia, 2nd
2006 IFBB Palm Beach Pro Figure, 1st
2007 IFBB Ms. Olympia, 6th

See also
 List of female fitness & figure competitors

References

Magazine References 

O'connell, Jeff.  Core Curriculum. California: Muscle and Fitness. July 2005 Edition. ISSN 0744-5105. (New York, NY: Weider Publications, LLC., a division of American Media Inc., 2005.). Section: Training and Fitness: pages 226-230, Covers Littlejohn's article.

External links 
Pictures and Competitive History
Amber Littlejohn's Competitive History

1975 births
Living people
Fitness and figure competitors
African-American people
American people of Cherokee descent
American people of Irish descent